Indian Railways Institute of Civil Engineering (IRICEN), Pune is the training institute for the Civil engineers of the Indian Railways. The institute had a modest start in 1959 as the Permanent Way Training School for training entry level Civil engineers. It is now a Centralised Training Institute and trains officers of the IRSE cadre of the Indian Railways.

Located in the city of Pune, IRICEN imparts training to up to 100 engineers/ managers at a time. Engineers from railways of the developing countries as well as other government departments/private organisations are also trained. The training programmes are generally residential in nature. Available infrastructure for conducting various training programmes includes a well-stocked technical library, computer centre, material testing laboratory, model room/ museum, hostel, mess and recreational facilities for the trainee officers.

The institute also trains railway engineers for other agencies including RITES, IRCON, NTPC, MRVC etc.

Sister organizations
The IRICEN is one of six Centralised Training Institutes that share the task of training of officers. The other Centralised Training Institutes are:

 Indian Railways Institute of Signal and Telecommunications Engineering, Secunderabad for engineers of S&T department,
 Indian Railways Institute of Mechanical and Electrical Engineering & Jamalpur Gymkhana, Jamalpur for mechanical engineers
 Indian Railways Institute of Electrical Engineering, Nasik for Electrical Engineers,
 RPF Academy, Lucknow, for officers of Railway Protection Force and
 Railway Staff College, Vadodara functions as the apex training institute for the officers of all departments in general and Accounts, Personnel, Stores, Traffic and Medical departments in particular. This institute has been renamed as National Academy of Indian Railway.

See also
 Indian Railways organisational structure

References

External links
 Indian Railways Institute of Civil Engineering, Pune
 Indian Railways information portal

Training institutes of Indian Railways
Education in Pune
1959 establishments in Bombay State